The 91st New York State Legislature, consisting of the New York State Senate and the New York State Assembly, met from January 7 to May 6, 1868, during the fourth year of Reuben E. Fenton's governorship, in Albany.

Background
Under the provisions of the New York Constitution of 1846, 32 Senators and 128 assemblymen were elected in single-seat districts; senators for a two-year term, assemblymen for a one-year term. The senatorial districts were made up of entire counties, except New York County (five districts) and Kings County (two districts). The Assembly districts were made up of entire towns, or city wards, forming a contiguous area, all within the same county.

On April 25, 1866, the Legislature re-apportioned the Senate districts. The new apportionment was first used at the election of 1867.

According to the Constitution of 1846, twenty years after its elaboration the electorate was asked if they wanted a Constitutional Convention to be held, which was answered at the New York state election, 1866, in the affirmative. On April 23, 1867, the delegates to the Constitutional Convention were elected, resulting in a Republican majority. On June 4, the Constitutional Convention met at Albany; adjourned on September 23; and met again on November 12.

At this time, there were two major political parties: the Republican and the Democratic.

Elections
The 1867 New York state election was held on November 5. All eight statewide elective offices up for election were carried by the Democrats. The approximate party strength at this election, as expressed by the vote for secretary of state, was: Democrats 373,000 and Republicans 325,000.

Sessions
The Legislature met for the regular session at the Old State Capitol in Albany on January 7, 1868; and adjourned on May 6. At the same time, the Constitutional Convention continued in session.

William Hitchman (D) was elected speaker.

On January 15, Charles J. Folger (R) was re-elected president pro tempore of the State Senate.

On February 12, the Legislature elected Matthew T. Brennan (D) to take office on March 1 as a Metropolitan Police Commissioner, for a term of eight years.

On February 28, the Constitutional Convention adjourned sine die. How to put the proposed amendments before the electorate was then debated throughout this and the next Legislature, and all amendments, except the re-organization of the judicial system, were eventually rejected by the voters at the New York state election, 1869.

On March 31, the trial of Canal Commissioner Robert C. Dorn (R) opened before the New York Court for the Trial of Impeachments, consisting of the State Senate and the judges of the New York Court of Appeals. Assemblymen William S. Clark, John L. Flagg, John C. Jacobs, John F. Little, William Lounsbery, Alpheus Prince, William B. Quinn (all seven Dem.), Nicholas B. La Bau and Edmund L. Pitts (both Rep.) appeared as the Managers to prosecute the impeachment. Smith M. Weed (D) appeared as counsel for the managers. Henry Smith (R) and John H. Reynolds appeared for the defense.

On April 7, the Legislature elected Abram B. Weaver (D) to succeed Victor M. Rice (R) as superintendent of public instruction for a term of three years.

On April 9, Assemblyman Elijah M. K. Glenn (R) accused Assemblyman Alexander Frear to have offered him on March 27 a bribe of $500.

On April 10, a select committee appointed to investigate concluded that "the evidence does not furnish any justification for the charges made by Mr. Glenn against Mr. Frear." Thereupon a resolution was passed to censure Glenn.

On April 11, Glenn resigned his seat.

On June 12, the impeachment trial ended with the acquittal of Dorn on all articles.

State Senate

Districts

 1st District: Queens, Richmond and Suffolk counties
 2nd District: 1st, 2nd, 3rd, 4th, 5th, 7th, 11th, 13th, 15th, 19th and 20th wards of the City of Brooklyn
 3rd District: 6th, 8th, 9th, 10th, 12th, 14th, 16th, 17th and 18th wards of the City of Brooklyn; and all towns in Kings County
 4th District: 1st, 2nd, 3rd, 4th, 5th, 6th, 7th, 13th and 14th wards of New York City
 5th District: 8th, 9th, 15th and 16th wards of New York City
 6th District: 10th, 11th and 17th wards of New York City
 7th District: 18th, 20th and 21st wards of New York City
 8th District: 12th, 19th and 22nd wards of New York City
 9th District: Putnam, Rockland and Westchester counties
 10th District: Orange and Sullivan counties
 11th District: Columbia and Dutchess counties
 12th District: Rensselaer and Washington counties
 13th District: Albany County
 14th District: Greene and Ulster counties
 15th District: Fulton, Hamilton, Montgomery, Saratoga and Schenectady counties
 16th District: Clinton, Essex and Warren counties
 17th District: Franklin and St. Lawrence counties
 18th District: Jefferson and Lewis counties
 19th District: Oneida County
 20th District: Herkimer and Otsego counties
 21st District: Madison and Oswego counties
 22nd District: Onondaga and Cortland counties
 23rd District: Chenango, Delaware and Schoharie counties
 24th District: Broome, Tompkins and Tioga counties
 25th District: Cayuga and Wayne counties
 26th District: Ontario, Seneca and Yates counties
 27th District: Chemung, Schuyler and Steuben counties
 28th District: Monroe County
 29th District: Genesee, Niagara and Orleans counties
 30th District: Allegany, Livingston and Wyoming counties
 31st District: Erie County
 32nd District: Cattaraugus and Chautauqua counties

Note: There are now 62 counties in the State of New York. The counties which are not mentioned in this list had not yet been established, or sufficiently organized, the area being included in one or more of the abovementioned counties.

Members
The asterisk (*) denotes members of the previous Legislature who continued in office as members of this Legislature. Thomas J. Creamer and Henry W. Genet changed from the Assembly to the Senate.

Party affiliations follow the vote for Senate officers.

Employees
 Clerk: James Terwilliger
 Sergeant-at-Arms: John H. Kemper
 Assistant Sergeant-at-Arms: George H. Knapp
 Doorkeeper: Charles V. Schram
 Assistant Doorkeeper: Nathaniel Saxton
 Assistant Doorkeeper: David L. Shields
 Assistant Doorkeeper: Elisha T. Burdick

State Assembly

Assemblymen
The asterisk (*) denotes members of the previous Legislature who continued as members of this Legislature. Nicholas B. La Bau changed from the Senate to the Assembly.

Party affiliations follow the listing in the Life Sketches.

Employees
 Clerk: Cornelius W. Armstrong
 Sergeant-at-Arms: Jared Sandford
 Doorkeeper: James Swarthout
 First Assistant Doorkeeper: 
 Second Assistant Doorkeeper:

Notes

Sources
 The New York Civil List compiled by Franklin Benjamin Hough, Stephen C. Hutchins and Edgar Albert Werner (1870; see pg. 439 for Senate districts; pg. 444 for senators; pg. 450–463 for Assembly districts; pg. 508f for assemblymen; and pg. 593ff for the Constitutional Convention)
 Journal of the Senate (91st Session) (1868)
 Journal of the Assembly (91st Session) (1868; Vol. II)
 Life Sketches of the State Officers, Senators, and Members of the Assembly of the State of New York in 1868 by S. R. Harlow & S. C. Hutchins
 Journal of the Court for the Trial of Impeachments in the Case of Hon. Robert C. Dorn, a Canal Commissioner of the State of New York (1868)

091
1868 in New York (state)
1868 U.S. legislative sessions